John O'Malley (May 13, 1878 – September 15, 1940) was an American politician and businessman.

Born in County Mayo, Ireland, O'Malley emigrated to the United States and settled in St. Louis, Missouri. In 1902, he moved to Milwaukee, Wisconsin. He was a stone mason and owned saloons in St. Louis and Milwaukee. He also worked for the Milwaukee Street Department. O'Malley served in the Wisconsin State Assembly from 1933 to 1937 and was a Democrat, O'Malley died in a hospital in Milwaukee, Wisconsin after a short illness.

Notes

20th-century Irish people
1878 births
1940 deaths
Irish emigrants to the United States (before 1923)
Politicians from County Mayo
Politicians from Milwaukee
Politicians from St. Louis
Businesspeople from Missouri
Businesspeople from Wisconsin
Democratic Party members of the Wisconsin State Assembly